Svenja Weidemann (born 22 September 1980 in Marburg) is a German tennis player. She won two singles titles on the ITF tour and on 12 April 2010 reached a singles ranking high of world number 496.

ITF finals (2–4)

Singles (2–1)

Doubles (0–3)

References

External links 
  
 
 

1980 births
Living people
Sportspeople from Marburg
German female tennis players
Tennis people from Hesse